Kevin John Humphries (born 2 April 1960), an Australian politician, was a member of the New South Wales Legislative Assembly representing Barwon for the Nationals from 2007 to 2019. He was the Minister for Healthy Lifestyles and Mental Health between 2011 and 2014; and the Minister for Western New South Wales in the O'Farrell government since April 2011. In April 2014, he was appointed as Minister for Natural Resources, Lands and Water during the Cabinet reshuffle under Premier Mike Baird.

Early years and background
Kevin Humphries is the son of Eileen and Frank Humphries who were married in Tamworth in 1958. He grew in Tamworth and attended St Edward's Primary School which was run at the time by the Sisters of St Joseph. He would on to complete his secondary education at the Christian Brothers College.

Kevin Humphries obtained a scholarship to study at the Catholic Teachers College in Strathfield. He then went to complete a Bachelor of Education externally through University of New England in Armidale, New South Wales.  He obtained a Graduate Diploma of Religious Studies (Grad Dip RE) through the Australian Catholic University in Brisbane.

His first teaching position was in 1981 at St Patricks Primary School in Walcha. It was in Walcha that he met his wife and where they were in 1985. They moved to Tamworth and he taught secondary school at Rosary College for four years. He then went on to become the Principal at Sacred Heart School at Boggabri, principal at Sacred Heart School at Geeveston in Tasmania and finally as principal at St Philomena's School in Moree in 1995.

It was in Moree in 1995 that Kevin Humphries first became a director of the Aboriginal Employment Strategy. In 2001 he left the school system and began a management consultancy company. His company specialised in worked in the cotton industry, aged care and the retirement sector.  In 2002 he became chair of the New England and North West Area Consultative Committee which was a Federal Regional Partnerships Program set up by the Australian Government.

Political career

Due to the resignation of Barry O'Farrell as Premier, and the subsequent ministerial reshuffle by Mike Baird, the new Liberal Leader, in April 2014 Humphries was promoted as Minister for Natural Resources, Lands and Water and retained the portfolio as Minister for Western New South Wales in the Baird ministry. Humphries lost his Cabinet roles in April 2015 due to a post-election reshuffle. Humphries was a member of Parliament as the Member for Barwon from 2007 until his retirement in 2019.

Personal life
Humprhies is married to Linda and has two sons and a daughter.

References

 

1960 births
Living people
People from Tamworth, New South Wales
Members of the New South Wales Legislative Assembly
National Party of Australia members of the Parliament of New South Wales
21st-century Australian politicians